Ander Gorostidi García (born 23 February 1996) is a Spanish footballer who plays for AD Alcorcón as a central midfielder.

Club career
Gorostidi was born in San Sebastián, Gipuzkoa, Basque Country, and was a Real Sociedad youth graduate. In June 2014, he was promoted to farm team Berio FT in Tercera División, and made his senior debut during the season.

On 3 June 2016, Gorostidi was promoted to the reserves in Segunda División B. On 19 January 2018, he renewed his contract with the Txuri-urdin until 2021.

On 12 August 2020, Gorostidi signed a three-year deal with Segunda División side AD Alcorcón. He made his professional debut on 13 September, starting in a 0–0 away draw against CD Mirandés.

References

External links

1996 births
Living people
Spanish footballers
Footballers from San Sebastián
Association football midfielders
Segunda División players
Segunda División B players
Tercera División players
Real Sociedad C footballers
Real Sociedad B footballers
AD Alcorcón footballers